The Mad Minute was a pre-World War I bolt-action rifle speed shooting exercise used by British Army riflemen, using the Lee–Enfield service rifle. The practice was described as; "Lying. Rifle to be loaded and 4 rounds in the magazine before the target appears. Loading to be from the pouch or bandolier by 5 rounds afterwards. One minute allowed". 

The practice was only one of the exercises from the annual classification shoot which was used to grade a soldier as a marksman, first-class or second-class shot, depending on the scores he had achieved.
The rapid aimed fire of the ‘Mad Minute’ was accomplished by using a 'palming' method where the rifleman used the palm of his hand to work the bolt, and not his thumb and forefinger, while maintaining his cheek weld and line of sight.

The "Second Class Figure Target" was 48 inches square (approximately 1.2 x 1.2 meters), with  inner  and  magpie circles. The aiming mark was a  silhouette figure that represented the outline of the head of a man aiming a rifle from a trench. Points were scored by a hit anywhere on the target.

World record

The term ‘Mad Minute’ was also used to describe a regular demonstration, by instructors at the School of Musketry at Hythe, Kent that was intended to show officer trainees the maximum rate of accurate fire that could be achieved by an expert with a service rifle.
 
The first Mad Minute record was set by Sergeant Major Jesse Wallingford in 1908, scoring 36 hits on a 48-inch target at 300 yards (4.5 mils/ 15.3 moa).

Another world record of 38 hits, all within the 24 inch target at 300 yards (2.25 mils/ 7.6 moa), is said to have been set in about 1914 by a Sergt.-Instructor Snoxall. ‘Sergt.-Instructor Snoxall’ was probably Sergeant Frank Snoxell of the Loyal North Lancashire Regiment, who was an instructor at the School of Musketry from October 1913 until January 1917. He was a Sergeant-Instructor from October 1913 until he was promoted in March 1915. Sergeant Snoxell had previously been a Sergeant-Instructor at the Branch School of Musketry at Satara in India.

A Mad Minute event was held in Soknedal, Norway, on 30 May 2015 featuring some of the best stang shooters in the country. The competition was called the "Mad Minute Challenge", and was shot at a round 400 mm diameter target at 200 meters (2 mils/ 6.9 moa), making the target smaller than original. The winner, Thomas Høgåsseter, scored 36 hits. The average score, of 11 shooters, was 29.

In 2019, Norwegian sport shooter Inge Hvitås set a new world record with 39 hits during a Mad Minute competition in Nes, Hedmark, out of 44 rounds fired. Also worth mentioning, Jesper Nilsstua fired 48 rounds during the same competition, but got 38 hits, and therefore came second having one hit less than Hvitås.

The modern Norwegian records have been made using the magazine fed SIG Sauer 200 STR, which is a target rifle as opposed to the stripper clip fed Enfield military rifles.

Target section sizes 
The tables below are based on the sections (12, 24, 36 and 48 inches) of the original Second Class Figure target placed at 300 yards, and shows the same relative target sizes for different ranges. The military service ammunition from that time (such as .303 British, .30-06 Springfield, 6.5×55mm, 8×57mm etc.) were more high powered and less prone to suffer from wind drift compared to modern military intermediate cartridge (such as 5.56 NATO, 5.45×39mm, 5.8×42mm, etc.). With the high powered calibers wind drift will barely be noticeable at 100 m, slightly more at 200 m and will only become a small factor at 300 m.

 Equivalent imperial target sizes

 Equivalent metric target sizes

See also 
 Felthurtigskyting
 Panjagan, a hypothesized ancient technique to fire a volley of five arrows

References

Sources

External links 
 Historical Firearms - The Mad Minute
 Video: Thomas Høgåsseter sets the world record of 36 hits in Soknedal, Norway 30 May 2015

Military terminology
Shooting sports